An echoborg is a person whose words and actions are determined, in whole or in part, by an artificial intelligence (AI).

The term "echoborg" was coined by social psychologists Kevin Corti and Alex Gillespie, whose research at the London School of Economics explored unscripted face-to-face social encounters between research participants and confederates whose words were covertly supplied by rudimentary AIs known as “chat bots" and vocalized via speech shadowing. The idea is derivative of the cyranoid concept that originated with Stanley Milgram.

The “echoborg method” allows one to investigate how people behave and make attributions toward an AI (or more precisely, a human-AI “hybrid”) when their psychological state is fully primed for human-human interaction. Other forms of human-AI interaction (e.g., computer-mediated conversation) involve a machine interface, anthropomorphic analog, or a virtual reality layer through which a person communicates with an AI, and these forms of mediation fundamentally alter the intersubjective relationship between the human and artificial agents party to an interaction.

The echoborg concept has been explored in performance art as commentary on the increasing ubiquitousness of AI and its contribution to human culture, as well as people's dependency on various types of AI (e.g., GPS navigation systems) for carrying out mundane social tasks.

See also
 Cyranoid
 Milgram experiment

References

Group processes
Psychology experiments